David M. Goodall is a British chemist. He is Emeritus Professor of chemistry affiliated with the University of York (UK). Throughout his career he has made a considerable impact on the field of analytical chemistry.

Achievements
Professor Goodall is one of the inventors of the UV imaging detection approach for applications in microscale chemical analysis. His scientific achievements include: development of separation methods based on capillary electrophoresis, real time visualisation of separations and reactions, imaging dissolution of pharmaceutical dosage forms, and high-sensitivity multiplexed detection in capillary electrophoresis and capillary liquid chromatography.

Representative publications
"Real-time image acquisition for absorbance detection and quantification in thin-layer chromatography." M Lancaster, D M Goodall, E T Bergström, S McCrossen and P Myers, Analytical Chemistry, 2006, 78, 905–911.
"A charge coupled device (CCD) array detector for single- and multi-wavelength ultraviolet absorbance in capillary electrophoresis." Bergstrom, E.T.; Goodall, D.M.; Allinson, N M; Pokric, B., Analytical Chemistry, Vol. 71, No. 19, 1999, p. 4376-4384.

See also
Analytical chemistry
Capillary electrophoresis

References

 http://www.chromatographytoday.com/articles/electrophoretic-separations/35/david_m._goodall_ed_bergstrm_and_mebs_surve/separation_size_and_charge_determination_of_small_molecules_using_ce_in_combination_with_uv_area_imaging_-_david_m._goodall_ed_bergstrm_and_mebs_surve/830/

Academics of the University of York
English chemists
Living people
Year of birth missing (living people)